In enzymology, a trans-aconitate 2-methyltransferase is an enzyme that catalyzes the chemical reaction

S-adenosyl-L-methionine + trans-aconitate  S-adenosyl-L-homocysteine + (E)-3-(methoxycarbonyl)pent-2-enedioate

Thus, the two substrates of this enzyme are S-adenosyl methionine and trans-aconitate, whereas its two products are S-adenosylhomocysteine and (E)-3-(methoxycarbonyl)pent-2-enedioate.

This enzyme belongs to the family of transferases, specifically those transferring one-carbon group methyltransferases.  The systematic name of this enzyme class is S-adenosyl-L-methionine:(E)-prop-1-ene-1,2,3-tricarboxylate 2'-O-methyltransferase.

Structural studies

As of late 2007, only one structure has been solved for this class of enzymes, with the PDB accession code .

References

 
 
 

EC 2.1.1
Enzymes of known structure